The 10th Golden Melody Awards ceremony was held at the Sun Yat-sen Memorial Hall in Taipei on April 30, 1999.

References

External links
  10th Golden Melody Awards nominees 
  10th Golden Melody Awards winners 

Golden Melody Awards
Golden Melody Awards
Golden Melody Awards
Golden Melody Awards